Schaumann is a German locational surname, derived from places in Germany called Schaum. It may refer to:

Axel Schaumann (born 1961), German athlete
Göran Schaumann (born 1940), Finnish sailor
Jörgen Nilsen Schaumann (1879–1953), Swedish dermatologist

See also
Schauman
Schaumann body 

German-language surnames